Malik Turner (Michael Muhammad) is an American rapper and producer from Fayetteville, NC, who came to prominence in the 1990s as a rapper. He is known for his politically aware, socially conscious lyrics, and sample heavy production. Malik is the other half of the duo, "Malik Turner (Malik - Mad Lyrics) and DJ Master Jam". The duo was formed in the early 1990s when Malik and DJ, Master Jam were college students at Cheyney University. In 1992 Malik and Jam, along with two friends, Allen "Nadir" Muhammad and Milton "Fahyim" Sharp formed "Son of Man Productions". In 1994, with the support of Guru from Gang Starr, and DJ Sean Ski, Son of Man Productions released the classic independent single, No More 9 to 5 and The Last Days of Wax on their own label "Mpacked Sounds". The classic record was mastered by mastering engineer Tony Dawsey.  Mpacked Sounds focused on a more independent label and artist ownership position in their music, during a time when their peers were interested in seeking record deals from major labels. At the time Billboard noted the lead single "No More 9 to 5", for having top 40 single potential and hip hop magazines like Rap Sheet and Rap Pages featured Malik and Master Jam as a rising duo to look out for. Projects with Mpacked Sounds led to opportunities to share the stage with the likes of Brand Nubian, the Fu-Schnickens, Black Sheep, Poor Righteous Teachers, Da Bush Babees, The U.M.C.'s, Rakim, and others.

Malik is also known for being a group member and lead vocalist (rapper) for the "New Blackbyrds", a Jazz fusion group formed by the legendary trumpeter, Donald Byrd; a sister project to Guru's (GangStarr) Jazzmatazz, The New Reality. Malik's work with Donald Byrd included numerous unreleased recorded songs, and performances at The Supper Club (NYC), SOB's, Brooklyn Academy of Music (BAM), the Playboy Jazz Festival (Hollywood Bowl), Catalina Jazz Club, Black Entertainment Television (Jazz Central) and more. Malik's association with Donald Byrd and the New Blackbirds has allowed him to share the stage with Jazz musicians such as Ramsey Lewis, Max Roach, Joe Sample, and others. Malik's unique lyrical ability and flexibility landed him the opportunity to perform in the dance musical "The Predators Ball -Huckstersof the soul" produced by Karole Armitage (The Armitage Foundation) and John Gould Rubin. The musical was performed at the Next Wave Festival, Brooklyn Academy of Music, and in Florence, Italy at Teatro Comunale Florence. Malik has written and perform for the sitcom "Cosby"  with friend and actor Doug E. Doug, and also Jazz musician Don Braden.

Early life 
Malik is the son of Juarita L. Turner and James M. Davis. He was raised by his mother in Fayetteville, NC, while his father lived in Trenton, NJ. While his father was a member of the Nation of Islam and later a member in the community of Imam Warith Deen Mohammed (son of Elijah Muhammad), who merged into mainstream Islam. Malik was not exposed to Islam until the age of 16. Malik at a young age moved to Fayetteville, NC, but lived in numerous states including, New Jersey, and New York. He attended and graduated from Terry Sanford Senior High School in Fayetteville, NC. At 10 years old, while living in Plainfield, NJ, he knew his calling was in Hip Hop and set out on a path to be an emcee. At a young age he would be found break dancing, and rhyming in middle school with childhood friend and rapper, Skillz (Mad Skillz). He started recording music in the mid-1980s with a childhood friend who was his DJ. After rocking many house parties, and working on his lyrical skills, he was offered to travel as a performer with a friend's father who DJ'ed parties throughout North Carolina. This was Malik's first paying gig a mere $50.00 a week. After visiting Trenton, NJ over the summer, and with the heavy influences of the Five Percent Nation, Malik soon began spending his summers between Trenton, and Brooklyn, NY. Around the same time Malik met Wise, Human Beat Box and rapper of Hip Hop band Stetsasonic at a show in Fayetteville, NC. The elder Wise took a liken to Malik, they kept in contact, and Wise began to school him on the music business. Malik was soon introduced through a relative to Melquan Smith (Melquan Productions) and Shabazz Fuller (Shabazz Brothers) of then Yamaka Records, who managed at the time Prince Rakeem (RZA, Wu Tang Clan), The Genius (GZA, Wu Tang Clan), and Divine Force. Malik soon began to hone his lyrical skills under the tutelage of Melquan and Shabazz and was soon taking lessons from his peers on Yamaka Records. With this new exposure, Malik continued working on his skills, recording music, and going to shows with the Yamaka Records team while spending more time in Brooklyn. While attending Cheyney University, Malik would travel back and forth to New York to get as much exposure as possible. In between traveling back and forth to New York, sitting in on recording sessions, and frequent visits to the Nuyorican Café (Lyricist Lounge), Malik began to redirect his focus on the business of music. In order to increase his knowledge of the music business and gain more insight and exposure, a friend recommended that he do an internship. He was soon introduced to Justo Faizon (Founder, Annual Mix Tape Awards), who was the A&R at Nervous Records and soon started working under Justo as an intern. Interning at Nervous Records, eventually led to an Internship with Select Records.

Education 
Malik Turner attended Cheyney University of Pennsylvania, the oldest HBCU in the United States. He also attended the College of New Rochelle, Metropolitan College of New York and New Brunswick Theological Seminary in New Jersey. Malik holds Bachelors and master's degrees.

Discography 
Malik Turner and Master Jam recently released music from the 1990s, which includes the re-release of "No-More 9 to 5" with additional unreleased songs on London based record label Chopped Herring Records. In 2016 Malik released Settlement #2 First Resurrection, Instrumentals on Mpacked Records. In 2011 Malik released two singles from his unreleased album Orgena: A Negro Spelled Backwards – "Serious???" feat. Adam Blackstone and "Get Your Mind Right". Malik has also done production on Ill Adrenaline artist's, Beneficence's 2016 album Basement Chemistry and did most of the production on his 2017 solo-album Invisible Freedom released on Osceola Music Group. Malik's work includes recordings and collaborations with artists and producers such as Beneficence, Jasiri X, Dominique Larue, Megahertz, 12 Finger Dan, DJ Sean Ski, DJ Master Jam, the late P-Original, Prince Strickland of Elwood, and more.

References

External links 
 Malik Turner on SoundCloud
 Malik Turner on Discogs

Living people
Musicians from Fayetteville, North Carolina
Rappers from North Carolina
Year of birth missing (living people)
21st-century American rappers